Traba or Trąba may refer to:

People
House of Traba, a medieval Galician noble family
Froila Vermúdez de Traba (died 1091)
Pedro Fróilaz de Traba (fl. 1086–1126)
Fernando Pérez de Traba (fl. c.1090–c.1155)
Bermudo Pérez de Traba (died 1168)
Rodrigo Pérez de Traba (fl. 1111–c.1160)
Gonzalo Fernández de Traba (died 1160)
Teresa Fernández de Traba (died 1180)
Fernando González de Traba (fl. 1159–1165)
Gómez González de Traba (fl. 1164–1209)
Mikołaj Trąba (1358–1422), Polish prelate
Marta Traba (1930–1983), Argentine art critic
Robert Traba (born 1958), Polish historian

Places
Galicia
San Miguel de Filgueira de Traba, a parish (parroquia) in the council (concello) of Oza-Cesuras in the county (comarca) of Betanzos
Santa María de Traba, a parish in the council of Coristanco in the county of Bergantiños
Santiago de Traba, a parish in the council of Laxe in the county of Bergantiños
Ponte de Traba, a place in the parish of Noia in the council of the same name
Traba, Araño, a place in the council of Rianxo
Traba, Xallas de Castriz, a place in the council of Santa Comba
Traba (river)

Poland
Trąba, Greater Poland Voivodeship, a settlement in Poland